Marqua Station is a pastoral lease that operates as a cattle station in the Northern Territory of Australia.

The property shares a boundary with Tarlton Downs to the west, Manners Creek Station to the north, Tobermorey to the east and the Atnetye Aboriginal Land Trust to the south. Marqua Creek, from which the station takes its name, flows through the property at the south eastern end. The property is very close to the Plenty Highway, which almost intersects the north west corner.

In June 2011 the  property was sold for 7.22 million on a walk-in walk-out basis. The property had been acquired by John and Mary Atkins, who also own Spion Kop Station near Taroom in Queensland, who were breeding cattle at Marqua then trucking them to Spion Kop.

After a prolonged dry period the property received  of rain over four days in January 2020. The owner, Blair Power, reported roads and fencing being damaged but the country was responding well to the rains.

See also
List of ranches and stations

References

Stations (Australian agriculture)
Pastoral leases in the Northern Territory